Dragon Master is a 1994 2D fighting arcade game developed and published by South Korean company UNiCO Electronics. It was released during the fighting game trend in the early 1990s that started with Capcom's Street Fighter II. Dragon Master is also available as a pre-installed game on the iiRcade home arcade platform.

Characters

Klaus Garcia
Gloria
Dark Man
Baekun Dosa
Jackie
Jedi Ryan
Deliza
Joey

Non-Playable Boss Characters

Dynamo
Mozard
Garner

External links
Dragon Master can be played for free in the browser on the Internet Archive

1994 video games
Arcade video games
Arcade-only video games
UNiCO Electronics games
Fighting games
Video games developed in South Korea

References